The 2017–18 Telesur Eerste Divisie is the 85th season of top tier Suriname football league and 1st season branded as the Eerste Divisie, the highest football league competition of Suriname. The season began on 20 October 2017 and ended on 24 June 2018.

Teams 
A total of 13 clubs took part in the league. Joining the league was West United and Papatam who played the previous season in the second-tier SVB Eerste Klasse. Jong Rambaan were relegated from the Topklasse to the Eerste Klasse.

Stadiums and locations

Standings
Final table.

Related competitions 

 2017–18 SVB Eerste Klasse
 2017–18 SVB Tweede Klasse
 2017–18 SVB Cup
 2017–18 SVB President's Cup

References 

SVB Eerste Divisie seasons
1
Suriname